Baños de la Encina is a city located in the province of Jaén, Spain. According to the 2006 census (INE), the city has a population of 2715 inhabitants. The 10th-century Burgalimar Castle is located on the southern edge of the town.

References

Municipalities in the Province of Jaén (Spain)